Erwood is a hamlet in the Canadian province of Saskatchewan. The hamlet has an outfitting business (for guided hunting), a community centre, and a Church of God. There is a traffic bridge on Highway 3, just west of the hamlet, where residents enjoy swimming in the Red Deer River. Residents of the area also maintain the Erwood Cemetery that exists approximately 1.5 miles from the hamlet.

Demographics 

Railway 
In 1890, the Canadian Northern Railway began building a line north from Swan River with the intention of reaching the Hudson Bay. They started building the line in the narrow corridor between the Porcupine Hills and Lake Winnipegosis, but instead decided to turn west into the North-West Territories where the logging industry was developing.

By 1900, the line was terminated at E.R. Wood, which later became known as Erwood. From 1903 to 1905, the line was extended to Melfort.

From 1907 to 1910, another rail line was built to connect the Erwood-Melfort line to The Pas. The two rail lines intersected at Etomami River, which was later renamed Hudson Bay Junction, because the new line to The Pas was intended to continue to the shores of the Hudson Bay.

Lumber Mills 
Several sawmills existed around Erwood throughout the early 20th century. Between the 1920s and 1940s, corporate sawmills were owned by Dart Lumber Company and Dovich Brothers, and private sawmills were owned by P.E. Sturby and Nick Ukrainetz.

Church of God
The Church of God in Erwood has been operating since the 1920s. The services were originally conducted in Russian, due to the large number of Belarusian, Russian, and Ukrainian immigrants in the area. Today, the services take place on Sunday mornings in English. The church also supports a summer camp at Greenwater Lake Provincial Park.

References

Designated places in Saskatchewan
Hudson Bay No. 394, Saskatchewan
Organized hamlets in Saskatchewan